Operation Seagull was a British action during the Second World War to destroy several Nazi-controlled industrial targets including a smelter at Arendal, with the help of Kompani Linge agents from Norway.

On 10 February 1943 the Norwegian submarine  was transporting the six-man sabotage team to Bodø when she hit a minefield laid by the German minelayer Cobra and sank, killing all 34 crew and the six agents.

In 1986, King Olav V unveiled a memorial to those lost aboard the Uredd, located in Grensen.

Team

 Lt. Per Getz
 Sub-Lt. Tobias Skog
 Sgt. Thorlief Daniel Grong
 Cpl. Sverre Granlund (also served as a commando during Operation Musketoon)
 Pte. Eivind Dahl Eriksen
 Pte. Hans Rohde Hansen

References

Seagull